James Nolan (June 23, 1901 — October 24, 1991) was an American politician and businessman who served several terms in the Alaska Legislature, representing Wrangell, Alaska as a Democrat.

Early life and education
Nolan was born on June 23, 1901 in Boston, Massachusetts, where he attended high school. He received an honorary doctorate from the University of Alaska Southeast in 1983.

In 1920, Nolan became a resident of Alaska at the age of 19.

Career
Nolan served in the Alaska House of Representatives from 1947 to 1951, representing the 1st legislative district of Alaska as a Democrat in the 18th and 19th territorial legislatures.

Nolan subsequently served in the Alaska Senate until 1967, representing the 1st legislative district of Alaska in the 20th, 21st, 22nd, and 23rd territorial legislatures, as well as District A of Alaska in the 1st, 2nd, 3rd, and 4th state legislatures. He was elected President of the Alaska Senate in 1955, and served until 1957.

Nolan was a delegate at the Alaska constitutional convention.

Outside of the Alaska Legislature, Nolan was a member of the Wrangell City Council, a chairman of the Selective Service Board, and president of the Wrangell Chamber of Congress.

In 1967, Nolan was appointed to the Board of Regents to succeed John Conway. His term expired in 1973.

Outside of politics, Nolan worked as a commercial fisherman during summers. He was also a U.S. Deputy Marshal in his community from 1934 to 1935.

Personal life and death
Nolan married Elsie Sylvester in 1925. He was a member of The Elks.

Nolan died at the age of 90 in Wrangell on October 24, 1991.

Notes

References

1901 births
1991 deaths
20th-century American politicians
Presidents of the Alaska Senate
Democratic Party Alaska state senators
Democratic Party members of the Alaska House of Representatives
Alaska city council members
University of Alaska Southeast alumni
People from Boston
People from Wrangell, Alaska